Boulevard Montmartre is one of the four grands boulevards of Paris. It was constructed in 1763. Contrary to what its name may suggest, the road is not situated on the hills of Montmartre. It is the easternmost of the grand boulevards.

History

In 1851, as part of its publicity, an auction of a gold ingot to finance the expatriation of 3,300 would-be gold prospectors to San Francisco was held. The ingot, valued at 400,000 francs, was exhibited on the boulevard.

Location
Contrary to what its name may suggest, the road is not situated on the hills of Montmartre but is the easterly extension of Boulevard Haussmann and the Boulevard des Italiens at their junction with Rue de Richelieu. Boulevard Montmartre marks the border between the 2nd and 9th arrondissements.

See also

 Boulevard Montmartre: Mardi Gras (1897 painting)
 Le Boulevard de Montmartre, Matinée de Printemps (1897 painting)

Sources
This page is a translation of its French equivalent.

Bibliography 
 Danielle Chadych et Dominique Leborgne, Atlas de Paris, Parigramme, 2002.

References

External links

 Official nomenclature of Parisian roads 

Boulevards in Paris
2nd arrondissement of Paris
9th arrondissement of Paris